Valtūnai is a village in Lithuania, Ukmergė district municipality, on the right bank of the Siesartis River. It is located in a region of lakes, forests, and rolling hills. According to the Lithuanian census of 2011, it had 20 residents.

References

Villages in Vilnius County
Vilkomirsky Uyezd